Vaaleduthaven Vaalaal is a 1979 Indian Malayalam film,  directed by K. G. Rajasekharan and produced by George Abraham. The film stars Prem Nazir, Jose, Jose Prakash and Pattom Sadan in the lead roles. The film has musical score by A. T. Ummer.

Cast

Prem Nazir
Jose
Jose Prakash
Pattom Sadan
Prameela
Unnimary
Adoor Bhavani
Balan K. Nair
Janardanan
K. P. Ummer
Kunchan
Meena
Paravoor Bharathan
Vidhubala
Bhavani

Soundtrack
The music was composed by A. T. Ummer and the lyrics were written by Chirayinkeezhu Ramakrishnan Nair.

References

External links
 

1979 films
1970s Malayalam-language films
Films directed by K. G. Rajasekharan